William Geddes may refer to:

William George Nicholson Geddes (1913–1993), Scottish civil engineer
William Duguid Geddes (1828–1900), Scottish scholar and educationalist
William Geddes (rugby union), New Zealand rugby player
 William Geddes (bishop) (1894–1947), Anglican bishop